Cynthia Gail Aaron (born May 3, 1957 in Minneapolis, Minnesota) is an associate justice of the California Fourth District Court of Appeal appointed to the post by Governor Gray Davis in 2003.

Aaron received an A.B. in psychology from Stanford University in 1979 and a J.D. from Harvard Law School in 1984.  From 1984–1988, she was a trial attorney with Federal Defenders of San Diego, Inc. In 1988, she co-founded a law firm where she worked until leaving appointed a U.S. Magistrate Judge in 1994.

Aarons left the magistrate judgeship when Governor Gray Davis appointed her as an associate justice of the California Fourth District Court of Appeal, Division One.

Aaron is married with one son and two adult stepchildren.

References

External links
Official biography of Cynthia Aaron
Cynthia Aaron profile on Judgepedia

1957 births
Living people
People from San Diego County, California
Stanford University School of Humanities and Sciences alumni
Harvard Law School alumni
Judges of the California Courts of Appeal
21st-century American judges
21st-century American women judges